This is a list of books, articles, and documentaries about snipers.

Books

Non-fiction
 
 
 
 Craig Harrison (2015) The Longest Kill: The Story of Maverick 41. .

Fiction

Articles
 Langewiesche, William. "The Distant Executioner". Vanity Fair. February 2010.

Documentaries
 History Channel. (2011). Sniper Inside the Crosshairs. Lionsgate Home Entertainment.

See also
 List of snipers

sniper

Lists of documentaries